Patrick Dimbala (born 20 September 1982 in Kinshasa) is a retired Congolese-Belgian footballer.

Career 

Dimbala has one official cap for DR Congo national football team.

Coaching career
Dimbala retired at the end of the 2016/17 season and was appointed as assistant manager of Olympic Charleroi. He decided to resign on 13 March 2019, the club announced.

References

 Player profile at The Guardian
 

1982 births
Living people
Footballers from Kinshasa
Democratic Republic of the Congo footballers
Democratic Republic of the Congo expatriate footballers
Democratic Republic of the Congo international footballers
Belgian footballers
Levadiakos F.C. players
PAS Giannina F.C. players
Panionios F.C. players
Panetolikos F.C. players
F.C.V. Dender E.H. players
Expatriate footballers in Greece
Super League Greece players
Association football forwards